The 2012 FIBA Europe Under-18 Championship was the 29th edition of the FIBA Europe Under-18 Championship. 16 teams featured the competition, held in Lithuania and Latvia from 9 to 19 August 2012. Spain were the defending champions. The top 5 teams qualify for the 2013 FIBA Under-19 World Championship.

Participating teams
  (Winners, 2011 FIBA Europe Under-18 Championship Division B)

  (Runners-up, 2011 FIBA Europe Under-18 Championship Division B)

Group stages

Preliminary round
In this round, the sixteen teams were allocated in four groups of four teams each. The top three advanced to the Qualifying Round. The last team of each group played for the 13th–16th place in the Classification Games.

Times given below are in CEST (UTC+2).

Group A

Group B

Group C

Group D

Second round
The twelve teams remaining will be allocated in two groups of six teams each. The four top teams will advance to the quarterfinals. The last two teams of each group will play for the 9th–12th place.

Group E

Group F

Classification round
The last teams of each group in the First Round will compete in this Classification Round. The four teams played in one group. The three teams will be relegated to Division B for the next season.

Group G

Knockout round

Championship

5th–8th playoffs

9th–12th playoffs

Classification 9–12

Quarterfinals

11th-place game

9th-place game

Classification 5–8

Semifinals

7th-place game

5th-place game

Bronze-medal game

Final

Final standings

Awards 

All-Tournament Team

 Marius Grigonis
 Dario Šarić
 Nikola Janković
 Nikola Radičević
 Mikhail Kulagin

References 

FIBA U18 European Championship
2012–13 in European basketball
2012–13 in Latvian basketball
2012–13 in Lithuanian basketball
International youth basketball competitions hosted by Latvia
International youth basketball competitions hosted by Lithuania
Sports competitions in Vilnius
21st century in Vilnius
August 2012 sports events in Europe